Jaroslav Mrázek (born January 14, 1986) is a Czech professional ice hockey defenceman who most recently played for LHK Jestřábi Prostějov of Czech 2.liga.

He was selected by the New York Islanders in the 6th round (179th overall) of the 2004 NHL Entry Draft.

Mrázek played with HC Kladno in the Czech Extraliga during the 2010–11 Czech Extraliga season.

Career statistics

Regular season and playoffs

International

References

External links

1986 births
Living people
People from Milevsko
Czech ice hockey defencemen
Rytíři Kladno players
New York Islanders draft picks
Sportspeople from the South Bohemian Region
Czech expatriate ice hockey players in Canada